Keeper of Dreams (2008) is a short story collection by Orson Scott Card.  It contains twenty-two stories by Card which do not appear in his collection Maps in a Mirror.  This collection was released on April 15, 2008.

Story list 
The short stories in this book are:

"The Elephants of Poznan"
"Atlantis"
"Geriatric Ward"
"Heal Thyself"
"Space Boy"
"Angles"
"Vessel"
"Dust"
"Homeless in Hell"
"In the Dragon's House"
"Inventing Lovers on the Phone"
"Waterbaby"
"Keeper of Lost Dreams"
"Missed"
"50 WPM"
"Feed the Baby of Love"
"Grinning Man"
"The Yazoo Queen"
"Christmas at Helaman's House"
"Neighbors"
"God Plays Fair Once Too Often"
"Worthy to Be One of Us"

See also

List of works by Orson Scott Card
Orson Scott Card

External links
 About the book Keeper of Dreams from Card's website

2008 short story collections
Short story collections by Orson Scott Card
Science fiction short story collections
Fantasy short story collections
Tor Books books